San Félix may refer to:

 Isla San Félix, one of the Desventuradas Islands, off the coast of Chile
 San Félix District, a district of Chiriquí Province, Panama
 San Félix, Chiriquí, a corregimiento in San Félix District, Panama
 San Felix River in San Félix District, Panama
 San Félix, a village in Santiago del Estero Province, Argentina
 San Félix (Tineo), a parish in Tineo, Asturias, Spain
 San Félix de Arce, a hamlet in Leon province of Spain
 San Félix, Venezuela, the old town half of Ciudad Guayana, Bolívar